The following is a list of notable deaths in September 2004.

Entries for each day are listed alphabetically by surname. A typical entry lists information in the following sequence:
 Name, age, country of citizenship at birth, subsequent country of citizenship (if applicable), reason for notability, cause of death (if known), and reference.

September 2004

1
Johnny Bragg, 79, American leader of The Prisonaires, one of earliest music groups to record for Sam Phillips and Sun Records.
Herbert H. Haft, 84, American owner of Dart Drugs Chain, congestive heart failure.
Kenneth Keith, Baron Keith of Castleacre, 88, British life peer and former chairman of Rolls-Royce, Hill Samuel, Beecham Group, and STC.
Ahmed Kuftaro, 89, Syrian Grand Mufti.
Sir Alastair Morton, 66, South African former chief executive of Eurotunnel and chairman of the Strategic Rail Authority.
Gordon Parry, Baron Parry, 78, Welsh politician.

2
Billy Davis, 72, American songwriter, record producer, singer and commercial jingle writer (I'd Like to Buy the World a Coke).
Bob O. Evans, 77, American IBM computer scientist.
Donald Leslie, 93, American creator of the Leslie speaker.
Joan Oró i Florensa, 80, Spanish biochemist.
Alan Preston, 71, New Zealand footballer and cricketer.
Brian Scarlett, 66, British physicist.
Paul Shmyr, 58, Canadian former National Hockey League and World Hockey Association defenseman, throat cancer.
Rose Slivka, 85, American writer, critic and editor, and a major figure in the advancement of crafts as a serious artistic discipline.

3
Steven Blackford, 28, American former University of Arizona wrestler, car accident.
Jozef Desiatnik, 60, Slovak footballer.
Yanis Kanidis, 74, Russian physical education teacher, killed by Chechen extremists.
Frenchy Uhalt, 94, American baseball player (Chicago White Sox).

4
Samira Bellil, 31, French feminist activist, campaigner for Muslim girls' and women's rights, stomach cancer.
Alphonso Ford, 33, American-born Euroleague player, leukemia.
Michael Louden, 40, American actor, brain aneurysm.
Moe Norman, 75, Canadian PGA and Canadian Tour golfer, congestive heart failure.
James O. Page, 68, American former chief of Emergency Medical Services and founder of modern emergency medical response, heart attack.
Caroline Pratt, 42, British equestrian eventer, killed during a race

5
Bruce Armstrong, 60, Australian football player.
Gerald Merrithew, 73, Canadian politician and former federal cabinet minister, cancer.
Alessio Perilli, 20, Italian motoracer, killed during a race.
Gerard Piel, 89, American science writer and editor (Scientific American).
Steve Wayne, 84, American actor.

6
Stephen Akiga, Nigerian politician.
Antonio Corpora, 95, Tunisian born Italian painter.
Elly Annie Schneider, 90, American dwarf actress, one of the Munchkins in The Wizard of Oz.
Morey Leonard Sear, 75, American judge (United States district judge of the United States District Court for the Eastern District of Louisiana).
Harvey Wheeler, 85, American political scientist and author (Fail-Safe).

7
Bob Boyd, 84, American former Major League Baseball player, first black player to sign with the Chicago White Sox.
Kirk Fordice, 70, American politician, first Republican governor of Mississippi since 1874, leukemia.
Fritha Goodey, 31, British actress (About a Boy), suicide.
Seppo Irjala, 66, Finnish sports shooter.
Beyers Naudé, 89, South African theologian and anti-apartheid activist.
Hal Reniff, 66, American baseball player (New York Yankees, New York Mets).
Munir Said Thalib, 38, Indonesian human rights activist, arsenic.
Christiaan Frederick Beyers Naudé, 89, Afrikaner-South African cleric, theologian and anti-apartheid activist.

8
Richard Girnt Butler, 86, American aerospace engineer, white supremacist, founder of the Aryan Nations
Mohammad Jusuf, 76, Indonesian military general
Raymond Marcellin, 90, French politician, Minister of the Interior (1968–1974)
Frank Thomas, 91, American animator (Cinderella, Bambi, Lady and the Tramp).
James Westphal, 74, American scientist, engineer, and astronomer.

9
Ernie Ball, 74, American guitar equipment maker.
Ian Cochrane, 62, Northern Irish novelist.
Rose Gacioch, 89, American baseball player (AAGPBL).
Donald R. Keith, 77, American army general.
Thomas Kerr, 80, British aerospace engineer.
Dhirendranath Mondal, 75, Indian cricketer.
Jimmy Spence, 69, British ice hockey player.

10
Brock Adams, 77, American politician.
Leonard Birchall, 89, Canadian Air Force officer.
O. L. Duke, 51, American actor (Malcolm X, Antwone Fisher, Out of Time), automobile crash.
Glyn Owen, 76, British actor (Emergency – Ward 10, Howards' Way).

11
Juraj Beneš, 64, Slovak composer.
Fred Ebb, 71, American Broadway lyricist (Cabaret, Chicago), heart attack.
Jimmy Lewis, 66, American soul musician.
David Mann, 64, American graphic artist.
Peter VII, 55, Greek Orthodox Patriarch of Alexandria, helicopter crash.

12
Max Abramovitz, 96, American architect.
Ahmed Dini Ahmed, 72, Djiboutian politician, vice-president of the government council (1959–60) and prime minister (1977–78).
John Buller, 77, British composer.
Jerome Chodorov, 93, American playwright, My Sister Eileen.

13
Bill Glassco, 69, Canadian theatre director and producer.
Luis E. Miramontes, 79, Mexican chemist.
Glenn Presnell, 99, American football player, coach, and college athletics administrator, early NFL player with the Detroit Lions.
Eric Sams, 78, British musicologist and Shakespeare scholar.

14
Reynaldo G. Garza, 89, American judge, first Hispanic American appointed as Federal Appeals Court judge.
Colin Griffiths, 73, English cricketer.
Richard Pierce, 86, American historian and scholar, specialized in the Russian era of Alaska.
Christopher Prior, 92, British Anglican priest, Chaplain of the Fleet and Archdeacon of Portsmouth.
John Seymour, 90, British self-sufficiency advocate.
Ove Sprogøe, 84, Danish actor.

15
Nalda Bird, 77, American baseball player (All-American Girls Professional Baseball League).
Donald Yetter Gardner, 91, American songwriter ("All I Want for Christmas Is My Two Front Teeth").
Bernard Gribble, 77, British film editor (Top Secret!, Death Wish, The Jokers).
Daouda Malam Wanke, 58, Nigerien military and political leader, leader of the 1999 transitional government in Niger.
Johnny Ramone, 55, American guitarist (The Ramones), prostate cancer.

16
Virginia Hamilton Adair, 91, American poet.
Izora Rhodes Armstead, 62, American singer, one of the two members of The Weather Girls.
Michael Donaghy, 50, American poet and musician.
Dolly Rathebe, 76, South African singer and actress (Jim Comes To Jo'burg).

17
Katharina Dalton, 87, British physician, pioneered research on premenstrual stress syndrome.
William Mulvihill, 81, American author, pancreatic cancer.
Evi Rauer, 88, Estonian actress and television director.
H. S. Rawail, 83, Indian filmmaker.
Galina Rumiantseva, 77, Russian Soviet painter and graphic artist.
Edmund Shea, 62, American photographer based in San Francisco, metastatic esophageal cancer.
Sudheer, Indian actor.

18
Norman Cantor, 74, Canadian-American medieval scholar.
Russ Meyer, 82, American filmmaker.
Marvin Mitchelson, 76, American divorce lawyer to the stars, cancer.
Klara Rumyanova, 74, Soviet and Russian actress and voice actress.

19
Eddie Adams, 71, American photojournalist.
Sir Stanley Clarke, 71, British businessman and philanthropist.
Skeeter Davis, 73, American country music singer.
Robert Smith Johnston, Lord Kincraig, 85, Scottish jurist, Senator of the College of Justice (1972-1987).
Ellis Marsalis, Sr., 96, American businessman, patriarch of family of jazz musicians.
Line Østvold, 25, Norwegian snowboarder.
Ryhor Reles, 91, Belarusian writer, the last writer from Belarus who wrote in Yiddish.
Derald Ruttenberg, 88, American investor and industrialist (merged Studebaker and Worthington Corporation into Studebaker-Worthington.

20
Eugene Armstrong, 52, American civilian contractor, beheaded by Muslim terrorists in Iraq.
Horst Baeseler, 74, German architect.
Brian Clough, 69, English footballer and cup-winning coach and manager.
Pat Hanly, 72, New Zealand painter, Huntington's disease.
Bill Shortt, 83, Welsh footballer.
Gerry Teifer, 82, American songwriter, music publisher and entertainer.
Kalmer Tennosaar, 75, Estonian singer and television journalist.

21
Alan Beaumont, 69, Australian admiral, chief of Australian Defence Forces.
Jack Hensley, 48, American civilian contractor, beheaded by Muslim terrorists in Iraq.
Robert Hungate, 98, American microbiologist.
David Pall, 90, Canadian-American chemist, invented sophisticated filters used in blood transfusions.
Larry Phillips, 62, American stock car racer.

22
Edward Larrabee Barnes, 89, American architect.
Cy Block, 85, American baseball player (Chicago Cubs).
Martha Van Coppenolle, 92, Belgian artist and book illustrator.
Pete Schoening, 77, American mountaineer legend.
Ray Traylor, 42, American professional wrestler known as The Big Boss Man.

23
Bill Ballance, 85, American radio personality, forerunner of shock jocks Tom Leykis and Howard Stern.
Lucille Dixon Robertson, 81, American jazz double-bassist.
Roy Drusky, 74, American country music singer, Grand Ole Opry star and smooth countrypolitan stylist of the 1960s.
André Hazes, 53, Dutch singer.
Nigel Nicolson, 89, British politician.
Bülent Oran, 80, Turkish screenwriter and actor.
Billy Reay, 86, Canadian professional ice hockey player and coach, former NHL player and coach for the Chicago Black Hawks.
Margaret Sloan-Hunter, 57, American feminist and civil rights advocate, former editor of Ms. Magazine.
Maurice Michael Stephens, 84, British World War II flying ace.
Abu Taher, 72, Bangladeshi banker and politician.

24
Tim Choate, 49, American actor (Babylon 5), motorcycle accident.
Raja Ramanna, 79, Indian nuclear scientist and father of India's nuclear program.
Françoise Sagan, 69, French novelist and playwright.
Roman Tsepov, 42, Russian businessman and confidant to Vladimir Putin, poisoned.
Ron Willey, 74, Australian rugbyplayer and coach.

25
Michael Davies, 68, British writer on Roman Catholicism.
Marvin Davis, 79, American industrialist and philanthropist, ex-owner of Twentieth Century Fox and Pebble Beach.
Alain Glavieux, 55, French mathematician, information technology pioneer.
Ma Chengyuan, 76, Chinese archaeologist, president of Shanghai Museum. Suicide.

26
Víctor Cruz, 46, Dominican baseball player (Toronto Blue Jays, Cleveland Indians, Pittsburgh Pirates, Texas Rangers).
Amjad Hussain Farooqi, 32, Pakistani terrorist, supposed member of Al-Qaida.
Izz El-Deen Sheikh Khalil, Palestinian Hamas leader, assassinated by car bomb.
Marianna Komlos, 35, Canadian bodybuilder, fitness model and professional wrestler, breast cancer.
Gladstone Mills, 84, Jamaican academic and public servant.
Philip H. Sechzer, 90, American pioneer in anesthesiology and pain management, known as the inventor of patient-controlled analgesia.

27
Bernard Slicher van Bath, 94, Dutch social historian.
Shobha Gurtu, 79, Indian singer.
John E. Mack, 74, American psychiatrist and writer, killed by a drunken driver.
Kishen Pattnaik, 74, Indian social leader, author and activist.
Louis Satterfield, 67, American bass and trombone player.
Dick Stenberg, 83, Swedish Air Force lieutenant general.
Tsai Wan-lin, 80, Taiwanese businessman and founder of the Lin Yuan Group.

28
Mulk Raj Anand, 98, Indian author.
Geoffrey Beene, 77, American fashion designer, pneumonia.
Carl Berntsen, 91, Danish Olympic sailor 
Scott Muni, 74, American radio disc jockey.
Vytautas Valius, 74, Lithuanian painter and graphic designer.

29
Ernst van der Beugel, 86, Dutch economist, businessman, diplomat and politician, former Dutch junior Foreign Minister and former CEO of KLM.
Gertrude Dunn, 70, American women's baseball and field hockey player, plane crash.
David Jackson, 49, New Zealand boxer.
Christer Pettersson, 57, Swedish criminal, suspected murderer of Swedish prime minister Olof Palme.
Richard Sainct, 34, French rally motorcyclist, accident.
Shimon Wincelberg, (aka S. Bar David), 80, American television writer.

30
Jacques Levy, 69, American songwriter, theatre director and clinical psychologist, director of original production of Oh! Calcutta!.
Ignatius Wolfington, 84, American character actor.
Willem Oltmans, 79, Dutch maverick journalist, cancer.
Michael Relph, 89, English film producer, art director and film director (nominated for Academy Award for Best Production Design for Saraband).
Justin Strzelczyk, 36, American football offensive tackle, former National Football League Pittsburgh Steelers player, car crash while leading police on chase.
Gamini Fonseka, 68, Sri Lankan actor and politician.

References 

2004-09
 09